CCFD is an acronym that could stand for:

Clark County Fire Department
Columbia Consolidated Fire Department
Caye Caulker Fire Department
Citizens Centre for Freedom and Democracy
Comité catholique contre la faim et pour le développement
Cajun Country Fire Department